Talahua  is a genus of hoverflies.

Species
T. fervida (Fluke, 1945)

References

Diptera of South America
Hoverfly genera
Syrphinae